Matteo Gagliani (9 October 1655 – September 1717) was a Roman Catholic prelate who served as Bishop of Sora (1703–1717) and Bishop of Fondi (1693–1703).

Biography
Matteo Gagliani was born in Naples, Italy. On 20 July 1693, he was appointed during the papacy of Pope Innocent XII as Bishop of Fondi. On 2 August 1693, he was consecrated bishop by Galeazzo Marescotti, Cardinal-Priest of Santi Quirico e Giulitta, with Prospero Bottini, Titular Archbishop of Myra, and Giovanni Battista Visconti Aicardi, Bishop of Novara, serving as co-consecrators. On 15 January 1703, he was appointed during the papacy of Pope Clement XI as Bishop of Sora. He served as Bishop of Sora until his death in September 1717.

Episcopal succession
While bishop, Gagliani was the principal co-consecrator:
Giacinto della Calce, Bishop of Ariano (1697);
Tommaso Maria Franza, Bishop of Oria (1697); and
Giambattista Isnardi de Castello, Bishop of Mondovi (1697).

References

External links and additional sources
 (for Chronology of Bishops) 
 (for Chronology of Bishops) 

17th-century Italian Roman Catholic bishops
18th-century Italian Roman Catholic bishops
Bishops appointed by Pope Innocent XII
Bishops appointed by Pope Clement XI
1655 births
1717 deaths